Roger Fournier (October 22, 1929 - May 31, 2012) was a Canadian writer and television director. He was most noted for his novel Le cercle des arènes, which won the Governor General's Award for French-language fiction and the Prix France-Québec in 1982, and his screenplay for the film A Day in a Taxi (Une journée en taxi), for which he received a Genie Award nomination for Best Original Screenplay in 1983.

He was a longtime television director for Télévision de Radio-Canada, including on the series Moi et l'autre and Bye Bye, and assisted in creating Gilles Vigneault's first concert tour.

Filmography
Inutile et adorable (1963)
À nous deux! (1965)
Les Filles à Mounne (1966)
Journal d'un jeune marié (1967)
La voix (1968)
L'innocence d'Isabelle (1969)
Gilles Vigneault, mon ami (1972)
La marche des grands cocus (1972)
Moi, mon corps, mon âme, Montréal, etc. (1974)
Les cornes sacrées (1977)
Pour l'amour de Sawinne (1984)
Les sirènes du Saint-Laurent (1984)
Chair Satan (1989)
La Danse éternelle (1991)
Le retour de Sawinne (1992)
Gaïagyne (1994)
Les mauvaises pensées (1996)
Le pied - contes érotiques et très cruels (1996)
Le Stomboat (1999)
Les miroirs de mes nuits (2000)

References

External links

 Fonds Roger Fournier (R11733) at Library and Archives Canada

1929 births
2012 deaths
20th-century Canadian novelists
20th-century Canadian short story writers
Canadian male novelists
Canadian male short story writers
Canadian novelists in French
Canadian short story writers in French
Canadian screenwriters in French
Canadian television directors
Canadian non-fiction writers
Writers from Quebec
French Quebecers
People from Bas-Saint-Laurent
Governor General's Award-winning fiction writers
20th-century Canadian male writers
Canadian male non-fiction writers